This is a list of by-elections and scheduled by-elections for the South Australian House of Assembly.

A by-election may be held when a member's seat becomes vacant through resignation, death or some other reasons. These vacancies are called casual vacancies.

Gains for Labor are highlighted in red; for Liberal and its predecessors in blue; and others in grey.

2020–2029

2010–2019

2000–2009

1990–1999

1980–1989

1970–1979

1960–1969

1950–1959

1940–1949

1930–1939

1920–1929

1910–1919

1900–1909

1890–1899

1880–1889

1870–1879

1857–1869

See also
List of South Australian Legislative Council appointments
List of South Australian Legislative Council by-elections

References
South Australian By-Elections 1851-2011: ECSA
History of South Australian Elections 1857-2006 Volume 1: ECSA
History of South Australian elections, 1857-2006 - by Dean Jaensch - 
House of Assembly Chronological List of By-elections (from 1993 Statistical Returns, State Electoral Office, p. 178-179)

South Australia

South Australian state by-elections